Marco Vélez (born June 26, 1980, in Carolina) is a Puerto Rican former footballer who played as a defender and currently works as coach for Puerto Rico Surf SC.

Career

Youth and college
Vélez began playing soccer at an early age in Puerto Rico with Colegio San Jose, but moved to Nick Bollettieri's IMG Soccer Academy when in high school. He then attended Barry University from 1999 to 2001, playing on the men's soccer team. During his freshman and sophomore years he was named first team All Conference.

Professional
Vélez was drafted by the MetroStars in the 2003 MLS SuperDraft, but decided to sign with the Seattle Sounders of the USL First Division instead of playing in Major League Soccer. While a defender in college, Vélez played as a forward during the 2003 season, before returning to the back line in 2004. He helped the Sounders reach the league finals in 2004.

Vélez signed with the Puerto Rico Islanders in 2005, where he scored 2 goals in 22 games playing as a defender. During the 2006 season, Vélez was instrumental in the Islanders' run to the playoffs and their qualification for the CONCACAF Champions Cup, the first time in team history they had qualified for either tournament. Vélez was selected to be the Islanders' captain during the CONCACAF Champions Cup qualifiers.

During the 2007 season, Vélez scored one goal and added one assist in twenty-seven games. His everyday play as defender was crucial to the Islanders advancing for the first time in team history to the USL Semi-Finals. Velez led the Islanders in matches and minutes played.

In July 2007, the California Cougars of Major Indoor Soccer League drafted Vélez in the sixth round (49th overall) of the league's supplemental draft., but he never played for the team.

Vélez transferred from the Puerto Rico Islanders to Toronto FC in 2008, and in doing so became the first native Puerto Rican to participate in MLS. He made his MLS debut on 29 March 2008 in a 2–0 defeat to Columbus Crew. In his first season in Major League Soccer, Vélez started all the games in which he participated.

Toronto FC released Marco on August 13, 2009 and returned to his former club Puerto Rico Islanders.  Vélez left Toronto with 38 appearances, 31 of those as a starter. The defender compiled 2,753 minutes and finished his time with the club with two goals, four cautions, and two ejections. In 2010, he re-signed with the Islanders.

International
Vélez made his debut for the Puerto Rico national football team in 2004, and was named captain of the team by coach Colin Clarke in 2008. He scored his first and only goal at the 2012 Caribbean Cup against Dominican Republic.

Coaching career
While playing his last season in the Puerto Rico Islanders, he also served as assistant coach. In 2013 he assisted Jeaustin Campos with the Puerto Rico U-15 national football team. In 2015 he coached Bayamón FC. In 2016 he was appointed assistant coach for Puerto Rico FC. He served as assistant coach until early 2017 when he took charge as interim head coach. After finishing the season with Puerto Rico FC, the team announced that it wasn't coming back for the 2018 season. In January 2018, he returned as head coach for Bayamón FC.

In June 2018, he took the role of assistant coach of the Puerto Rico national football team after former Toronto FC teammate Amado Guevara was appointed as head coach.

In December 2018, Amado Guevara confirmed that Marco Vélez will coach the Puerto Rico national under-17 football team during 2019 World Cup Qualification.

Honors

Player

Toronto FC
Canadian Championship Winner (1): 2009

Puerto Rico Islanders
USSF Division 2 Pro League Champions (1): 2010
CFU Club Championship::Winner (1): 2010

Coach

Bayamón FC
Puerto Rican Football Federation Preparatory Tournament Champions (1): 2018

References

External links
 
 Puerto Rico Islanders bio
 
 2003 Sounder stats
 2004 Sounder stats

1980 births
Living people
Association football defenders
Barry University alumni
IMG Academy Bradenton players
Expatriate soccer players in Canada
Expatriate soccer players in the United States
Major League Soccer players
North American Soccer League players
People from Carolina, Puerto Rico
Puerto Rican expatriate footballers
Puerto Rican expatriate sportspeople in Canada
Puerto Rican footballers
Puerto Rico international footballers
Puerto Rico Islanders players
Seattle Sounders (1994–2008) players
Toronto FC players
A-League (1995–2004) players
USL First Division players
USL League Two players
USSF Division 2 Professional League players
New York Red Bulls draft picks